Emil Beyer (November 22, 1876 in New York – October 15, 1934 in Rockville Centre, New York) was an American gymnast and track and field athlete who competed in the 1904 Summer Olympics.

Born to German immigrant parents in New York state, Beyer was a member of the New York Turnverein.  In 1904 he won the silver medal in the team event. He was also 30th in gymnastics all-around event, 34th in gymnastics' triathlon event and 36th in athletics' triathlon event.

He had entered the United States Military Academy in 1897, but failed to graduate.  In later life, he operated a drug store.

References

External links
 

1876 births
1934 deaths
American male artistic gymnasts
Athletes (track and field) at the 1904 Summer Olympics
Gymnasts at the 1904 Summer Olympics
Olympic silver medalists for the United States in gymnastics
Medalists at the 1904 Summer Olympics
Track and field athletes from New York (state)
United States Military Academy alumni